James Henry Fleming (Toronto, July 5, 1872 – June 27, 1940) was a Canadian ornithologist. His father was Scottish, and sixty years old when his son was born. James became interested in birds at the age of 12. He was an associate member of the Royal Canadian Institute at 16. In 1916, he became a fellow of the American Ornithologists' Union (AOU), and by 21 was an associate member. He eventually became its president, holding the post from 1932 to 1935. His standing as an ornithologist was recognized in many ways. The National Museum of Canada made him honorary curator of ornithology in 1913. He was elected British Empire Member of the British Ornithological Union; Corresponding Member of the Zoological Society of London; and Membre d'Honneur Étranger of the Société Ornithologique et Mammalogique de France.

He was an honorary (but active) member of the Brodie Club, Toronto; an Honorary Member of the Toronto Ornithological Club; Honorary Vice-President of the Toronto Field Naturalists' Club; and in 1927, he was made Honorary Curator of the Royal Ontario Museum of Zoology.  Over his life he amassed a vast collection of specimens, numbering over 32,000, and a large ornithological library considered to be one of the largest and most representative private collections at the time.  This research collection went to The Royal Ontario Museum upon his death.

References 

Canadian ornithologists
1872 births
Place of birth missing
1940 deaths
Place of death missing